The Last Hungry Cat is a Warner Bros. Merrie Melodies cartoon animated short directed by Friz Freleng and Hawley Pratt. The short was released on December 2, 1961, and stars Tweety and Sylvester.

Plot 
The short opens with a shadow of a bear walking up to an outline silhouette of himself and, speaking in a quasi-Hitchcockian accent, announcing, "Tonight, ladies and gentlemen, we bring you a story about...murder."

The story opens with Sylvester waiting outside Granny's apartment as she puts Tweety to bed and goes to visit a neighbor. He then sneaks into the apartment and stacks a bunch of furniture to reach the bird cage, but the stack collapses and the fall knocks him out long enough for Tweety to escape. When he comes to, he finds one of Tweety's feathers in his mouth and mistakenly believes that he has eaten him. Hearing Granny returning, Sylvester runs out of the apartment and hides in a nearby alley.

The Hitchcock-bear (off-screen) taunts Sylvester's success in finally eating Tweety, stating that he had to commit murder to do it, but Sylvester, breaking the fourth wall, laughs off the Hitchcock-bear's suggestion. But the Hitchcock-bear begins to play on Sylvester's nerves, suggesting that there is a good chance that nobody will ever find out about it; then, when Sylvester sees a newspaper headline saying "Police Hunt 'The Cat' " (referring to a human criminal with that alias) and hears sirens of police cars, he hides in a nearby house and attempts to get what he did off his mind, but to no avail, especially after an embarrassed announcer on the radio flubs his announcement by saying, "Your local company would like to present gas chamber music ...err... your local gas company would like to present chamber music." He tries to get some sleep but, after staying awake all night haunted by his guilt, jumps up screaming, runs into the bathroom and both swallows, and showers himself with, multiple sleeping pills, which also fail to help.

As Sylvester lies on the bathroom floor sobbing, the Hitchcock-bear suggests that he give himself up and accept the consequences; Sylvester agrees and runs through the alleys yelling "I did it! I'm guilty!" all the way back to Granny's apartment where he finds Tweety asleep in his cage, safe and sound. Overjoyed, Sylvester grabs the bird, kissing him over and over again, but when he is tempted and again tries to eat the bird, he is attacked by Granny, who chases him out of the apartment while hitting him with a broom. Tweety comments, "That puddy tat's gonna have an awful headache in da morning."

At the end, the Hitchcock-bear attempts to relate the moral of the story quoting Shakespeare, saying, "In the words of the Bard, 'conscience makes cowards of us all.'" Sylvester (off-screen) shouts "Ahhh, shaddup!" and hits him on the head with a brick. The Hitchcock-bear says "Good evening," then walks off with a lump on his head, the lump also having grown on his outline.

Production notes
The Last Hungry Cat is a parody of Alfred Hitchcock Presents and contains a plot similar to both Hitchcock's movie Blackmail and the previous cartoon short Birds Anonymous. The title is a play on the 1959 film The Last Angry Man.

Availability 
The Last Hungry Cat can be found on the DVD collection Looney Tunes Golden Collection: Volume 3, and Looney Tunes Super Stars' Tweety & Sylvester: Feline Fwenzy.

See also 
 List of American films of 1961

References

External links 

1961 animated films
1961 short films
Merrie Melodies short films
Warner Bros. Cartoons animated short films
Short films directed by Friz Freleng
Films scored by Milt Franklyn
Films set in apartment buildings
American parody films
1961 films
Animated films about cats
Animated films about birds
1960s Warner Bros. animated short films
Tweety films
Sylvester the Cat films
1960s English-language films